The Lodi Street-Prairie Street Historic District is located in Lodi, Wisconsin.

Description
The district is made up of a residential neighborhood including the 1855 Italianate McCloud house, the 1874 Greek Revival Hinds house, the commercial vernacular Clements House hotel, the 1897 Queen Anne Seville house, and the 1915 Posta bungalow. It was added to the State and the National Register of Historic Places in 2000.

References

Historic districts on the National Register of Historic Places in Wisconsin
National Register of Historic Places in Columbia County, Wisconsin